The Cantonal Bank of Valais is the cantonal bank of the Swiss canton of Valais. It is part of the 24 cantonal banks serving Switzerland's 26 cantons. Founded in 1916, in 2014 the bank had 57 branches across Switzerland with 445 employees; total assets of the bank were 13 178.04 mln CHF. It has full state guarantee of its liabilities.

Notes and references

See also 
 Cantonal bank
 List of banks in Switzerland

External links 
 

Valais